Ogier is a law firm with offices in the BVI, Cayman, Guernsey, Ireland, Jersey and Luxembourg. It is a member of the offshore magic circle.

History 
 2022: Ogier merges with Irish law firm, Leman Solicitors, to form Ogier Leman.
 2022: Ogier launches Beijing office.
 2021: Ogier launches Singapore office.
 2017: Ogier launches Ogier Global to create an integrated corporate administration team.
 2015: Ogier launches new brand identity focused on law.
 2014: Ogier launches Dispute Resolution into Hong Kong.
 2014: Management Buy-out of Ogier Fiduciary Services. 
 2013: Ogier Fiduciary Services opens an office in Luxembourg.
 2012: Ogier becomes the first offshore law firm to open an office in Luxembourg.
 2011: Ogier opens an office in Shanghai, making it the first offshore law firm to operate out of mainland China.
 2007: Ogier merges with WSmith based in BVI and Hong Kong.
 2005: Ogier & Le Masurier becomes Ogier.
 2004: Ogier creates the first trans-Atlantic offshore law firm when it merged with Boxalls in Cayman.
 1995: The two law firms Le Masurier Giffard & Poch and Ogier & Le Cornu merge to create the Ogier Group.
 1932: Philip Antonio Poch was made partner alongside Le Masurier and Gifford to form Le Masurier Giffard & Poch.
 1922: A partnership between Advocate Leonce L’Hermite Ogier and John Gleury Le Cornu is formed.
 1905: William Smyth Le Masurier joins John Giffard’s practice.
 1867: John Francis Giffard begins practicing law in St Helier, Jersey.

Offices 

Ogier has offices based in Beijing, British Virgin Islands, Cayman, Guernsey, Hong Kong, Ireland, Jersey, London, Luxembourg, Shanghai, Singapore and Tokyo.

References

External links 

 Ogier Website
 Profile of firm on Legal 500
 Profile of firm on Chambers UK
Offshore law firms
Companies of Jersey
Offshore magic circle